The Leyenda de Plata (2001) was professional wrestling tournament produced by the Mexican wrestling promotion Consejo Mundial de Lucha Libre (CMLLl; Spanish "World Wrestling Council") that ran from October 5, 2001, over the course of three of CMLL's Friday night shows in Arena México with the finals on October 19, 2001. The annual Leyenda de Plata tournament is held in honor of lucha libre legend El Santo and is one of CMLL's most important annual tournaments.

The 2001 Leyenda de Plata was the first tournament to feature a battle royal to determine the two teams for the torneo cibernetico elimination match. The first eight men eliminated from the battle royal would be one team and the remaining eight wrestlers would form the other team in the cibernetico match that followed immediately after the battle royal. Team "A" consisted of Averno, Black Warrior, Black Tiger, Fuerza Guerrera, Juventud Guerrera, Dr. Wagner Jr., Mephisto and Másacara Mágica. Team "B" consisted of Antifaz, Atlantis, Blue Demon Jr., El Hijo del Santo, El Felino, Ricky Marvin, Safari and Virus. The last two survivors were Black Warrior and Black Tiger, both from Team "A". On October 12, 2001, Black Warrior and BlacK Tiger faced off in a singles match that Black Warrior won. The storyline of the match was Black Tiger turning Rudo (heel or "bad guy") while Black Warrior was turning Tecnico (face or "good guy") during the course of the match. The following week Black Warrior's momentum helped him gain the victory over Negro Casas to win the 2001 Leyenda de Plata.

Production

Background
The Leyenda de Plata (Spanish for "the Silver Legend") is an annual lucha libre tournament scripted and promoted by the Mexican professional wrestling promotion Consejo Mundial de Lucha Libre (CMLL).  The first Leyenda de Plata was held in 1998 and was in honor of El Santo, nicknamed Enmáscarado de Plata (the Silver mask) from which the tournament got its name. The trophy given to the winner is a plaque with a metal replica of the mask that El Santo wore in both wrestling and lucha films.

The Leyenda de Plata was held annually until 2003, at which point El Santo's son, El Hijo del Santo left CMLL on bad terms. The tournament returned in 2004 and has been held on an almost annual basis since then. The original format of the tournament was the Torneo cibernetico elimination match to qualify for a semi-final. The winner of the semi-final would face the winner of the previous year's tournament in the final. Since 2005 CMLL has held two cibernetico matches and the winner of each then meet in the semi-final. In 2011, the tournament was modified to eliminate the final stage as the previous winner, Místico, did not work for CMLL at that point in time The 2001 edition of La Leyenda de Plata was the fourth overall tournament held by CMLL.

Storylines
The events featured a total of number of professional wrestling matches with different wrestlers involved in pre-existing scripted feuds, plots and storylines. Wrestlers were portrayed as either heels (referred to as rudos in Mexico, those that portray the "bad guys") or faces (técnicos in Mexico, the "good guy" characters) as they followed a series of tension-building events, which culminated in a wrestling match or series of matches.

Tournament overview

Cibernetico

Results

October 5, 2001

October 12, 2001

October 19, 2001

References

2001 in professional wrestling
Leyenda de Plata
Events in Mexico City
October 2001 events in Mexico